Chinna Thambi is a 25-year-old wild bull elephant from India. He was captured by forest officials in Coimbatore south Tamilnadu and translocated to kraal at Varakaliyar elephant camp near Topslip. The elephant then escaped and walked more than  back to the place from where he was captured in search of his family. This elephant was both loved and feared by the villagers.

History
Chinna Thambi a 25 year old elephant was born in the area known as Booluvamppati in Coimbatore range, this elephant was named chinna thambi by one Mr Abraham who is an environmental Photographer in Annaikatti hills near Coimbatore. This animal was first spotted by him in the year 2007 at a place called Thanni Paarai near the Anuvavi Subramanyaswamy Temple. Due to encroachment of the forest area his habitat had been destroyed and as a result of lack of food this elephant started to destroy the crops of the village. Based on the public concerns the elephant was first captured from Thadagam village on 25 January 2019 and was translocated to the Topslip tiger reserve and was released in Varakaliyaru forest area. The forest department again returned him back to the forest area but he always walked back. Later the tusker was captured from Sarkar Kannadipur village near Madathukulam in Tirupur district and shifted to kraal at varakaliyar elephant camp near Topslip.

How he was trained
It was said that Chinna Thambi will be trained as a kumki elephant but a petition was filed in Chennai High court against the conversion, in the meanwhile, Tamilnadu government said he will be released in the forest again and will not be trained as tamed tusker. After the training from the camp, the tusker was released in the forest.

References

Elephants in India